Qeshlaq-e Hajji Hasan Hajj Eslam (also Romanized as Qeshlāq-e Ḩājjī Ḩasan Ḩājj Eslām) is a village in Qeshlaq-e Shomali Rural District, in the Central District of Parsabad County, Ardabil Province, Iran. At the 2006 census, its population was 56, in 10 families.

References 

Towns and villages in Parsabad County